The Berliner Kunstpreis (Berlin Art Prize), officially Großer Berliner Kunstpreis, is a prize for the arts by the City of Berlin. It was first awarded in 1948 in several fields of art. Since 1971, it has been awarded by the Academy of Arts (Akademie der Künste) on behalf of the Senate of Berlin. Annually one of its six sections, fine arts, architecture, music, literature, performing arts and film and media arts, gives the great prize, endowed with €15,000, whereas the other five sections annually award prizes endowed with €5,000.

History
The Berlin Art Prize has been awarded since 1948 in commemoration of the March Revolution of 1848. The official name then, Berliner Kunstpreis – Jubiläumsstiftung 1848/1948 (Berlin Art Prize - 1848/1948 Jubilee Foundation), was used until 1969, the ceremony was held by the Mayor in the Charlottenburg Palace.

The prize was planned to be awarded first on 18 March 1948 by the City Berlinale, to commemorate the March Revolution and the revolutionaries who fell for a new state (für einen neuen Staat gefallenen Revolutionäre). The first prize winners of 1948, shortly before the currency reform, who received awards of 10,000 Mark, were the sculptor Renée Sintenis and the composers Ernst Pepping and Wolfgang Fortner. The then-Senator of Education awarded the prize without consulting a jury.

In 1949 a constitution was drafted. The prize (per section DM 3,000.00) should be awarded annually for achievements in literature, music, painting, graphic and performing arts. As a result, changes were made regarding the divisions, the division between several winners and the award criteria. From the mid-1950s, the ceremony was always accompanied by criticism.

Since 1971, the prize is awarded by the Academy of Arts. The Academy awards the prize annually in alternating intervals of its six sections in the order of fine arts, architecture, music, literature, performing arts and film and media arts. The Arts Award for "Film and Media Arts" award since 1984 and from 1956 to 1983, there were instead the Arts Award for "Radio-Television-Film." The prize, awarded every six years by the literature section was named in 2010 the Fontane Prize.

Selected Great Prize recipients

 1971: Rainer Küchenmeister
 1972: György Ligeti (Music)
 1973: Bernhard Minetti
 1974: Gottfried Böhm
 1975: Josef Tal
 1976: Wilhelm Borchert
 1977: Joachim Schmettau
 1980: Peter Stein (returned)
 1981: George Tabori
 1982: Meret Oppenheim
 1983: Rolf Gutbrod
 1984: Olivier Messiaen
 1986: Marianne Hoppe
 1987: Lina Wertmüller
 1988: Rupprecht Geiger
 1989: Norman Foster
 1990: Luigi Nono
 1992: Peter Zadek
 1993: Otar Iosseliani
 1994: Dieter Roth
 1995: Renzo Piano
 1996: Pierre Boulez
 1998: Horst Sagert
 1999: Kira Georgijewna Muratowa
 2000: Anna and Bernhard Blume
 2001: Hermann Czech
 2002: Aribert Reimann
 2004: Ernst Busch Academy of Dramatic Arts
 2005: Aki Kaurismäki
 2006: George Brecht
 2007: Architects office SANAA (Kazuyo Sejima and Ryue Nishizawa) in Tokio
 2008: Helmut Lachenmann
 2010: Thomas Langhoff
 2011: Claire Denis
 2012: Cristina Iglesias 
 2013: Florian Beigel
 2014: Mathias Spahlinger
 2015: Sherko Fatah
 2016: Stefan Prins
 2017: Emin Alper
 2018: Thomas Demand
 2019: Renée Gailhoustet
 2020: Younghi Pagh-Paan
 2021: 
 2022: Richard Peduzzi

Selected prize recipients 
Recipients are typically listed in the sequence "Bildende Kunst" (art), "Baukunst" (architecture), "Musik" (music), "Darstellende Kunst" (performing art), "Film-Hörfunk-Fernsehen" (media)

 1948: Renée Sintenis, Ernst Pepping, Wolfgang Fortner
 1950: Bernhard Heiliger, Karl Hartung, Hans Uhlmann, Werner Heldt, Hans Jaenisch, Wolf Hoffmann, Wilhelm Deffke, Mac Zimmermann, Carl-Heinz Kliemann (art), Werner Egk, Helmut Roloff, Dietrich Fischer-Dieskau (music), Heinz Tietjen, Boleslaw Barlog (performing art)
 1951: Louise Stomps, Mac Leube, Hans-Joachim Ihle, Theodor Werner, Alexander Camaro, Marcus Behmer, Siegmund Lympasik (art), Boris Blacher, Gerhard Puchelt (music), Hermine Körner, O. E. Hasse (performing art)
 1952: Richard Scheibe, Lidy von Lüttwitz, Gerhart Schreiter, Karl Schmidt-Rottluff, Woty Werner, Eva Schwimmer, Gerda Rotermund, Georg Gresko (art), Arthur Rother, Helmut Krebs, Giselher Klebe (music), Mary Wigman, Frank Lothar, Kurt Meisel (performing art)
 1953: Alexander Gonda, Emy Roeder, Johannes Schiffner, Karl Hofer, Otto Hofmann, Ernst Böhm, Dietmar Lemke, Elsa Eisgruber (art); Gerda Lammers, Karl Forster, Max Baumann (music); Käthe Dorsch, Ita Maximowna, Wolfgang Spier (performing art)
 1954: Paul Dierkes, Ursula Förster, Otto Placzek, Max Pechstein, Curt Lahs, Hans Thiemann, Hans Orlowski, Sigmund Hahn (art), Erna Berger, Hertha Klust, Volker Wangenheim (music); Tatjana Gsovsky, Käthe Braun, Caspar Neher (performing art)
 1955: Gerhard Marcks, Hans Purrmann, Manfred Bluth, August Wilhelm Dressler, Max Taut, Hans Scharoun, Sergiu Celibidache, Joseph Ahrens, Josef Greindl, Walter Franck
 1956: Heinz Trökes, Hugo Häring, Philipp Jarnach, Ernst Schröder, Helmut Käutner
 1957: Erich Heckel, Ludwig Hilberseimer, Heinz Tiessen, Joana Maria Gorvin, Heinz Rühmann
 1958: Fritz Winter, Wassili Luckhardt, Hans Werner Henze, Martin Held, Robert Siodmak
 1959: Elsa Wagner
 1960: Julius Bissier, Paul Baumgarten, Wladimir Vogel, Erich Schellow, Günter Neumann, Heinz Pauck
 1961: Rudolf Belling, Ludwig Mies van der Rohe, Karl Amadeus Hartmann, Willi Schmidt, Robert Müller
 1962: Friedrich Ahlers-Hestermann, Egon Eiermann, Gerhart von Westerman, Gert Reinholm, Hans Rolf Strobel and Heinz Tichawsky
 1963: Max Kaus, Sergius Ruegenberg, Paul Hindemith, Fritz Kortner, Jürgen Neven-du Mont
 1964: Ernst Wilhelm Nay, Werner Düttmann, Hans Chemin-Petit, Rolf Henniger, Wolfgang Neuss
 1965: Jan Bontjes van Beek, Hermann Fehling, Elisabeth Grümmer, Ernst Deutsch
 1966: Hann Trier, Walter Rossow, Johann Nepomuk David, Rudolf Platte, Dieter Ertel
 1967: Rudolf Hoflehner, Frei Otto, Karl Böhm, Gustav Rudolf Sellner, Hans Richter
 1968: Wilhelm Wagenfeld, Erwin Gutkind, Heinz Friedrich Hartig, Hans Lietzau, Georg Stefan Troller
 1969: Heinrich Richter, Ludwig Leo, Bernd Alois Zimmermann, Herbert Ihering, Peter Zadek
2021: Sajan Mani, HARQUITECTES, Petra Strahovnik, Gina Haller, Susann Maria Hempel, Lea Schneider (literature)

References

External links

Awards established in 1948
Arts awards in Germany